Alexei Vladimirovich Lezin (born February 27, 1973) is a Russian former amateur boxer, who won the Super Heavyweight bronze medal at the 1996 Summer Olympics.

Accomplishments
1993 competed as a Heavyweight at the World Championships in Tampere, Finland. Lost to Félix Savón in the quarter-final.
1994 won the Military World Championships in Tunis, Tunisia as a Super Heavyweight, defeating Vitali Klitschko in the final.
1994 won the Goodwill Games in Saint Petersburg, Russia, defeating Nikolay Valuev and Lance Whitaker.
1995 won the World Championship in Berlin, Germany, defeating Vitali Klitschko in the final.
1995 2nd place at Military World Championship in Ariccia, Italy. Lost to Vitali Klitschko in the final.
1996 won the European Championship in Vejle, Denmark, defeating Wladimir Klitschko in the final.
1997 competed at World Championship in Budapest, Hungary. Lost to Alexis Rubalcaba in the quarter-final.
1998 won the European Championship in Minsk, Belarus. Defeated Sinan Samil Sam in the Semifinal.
2000 won the European Championship in Tampere, Finland, defeated Paolo Vidoz in the final.
2003 won the Russian National Championships in Ulyanovsk, Russia, defeating Alexander Povetkin in the final.

Olympic results
1996 won the bronze medal at the Atlanta Olympics representing Russia.
 Defeated Mikhail Yurchenko (Kazakhstan) RSC-1
 Defeated René Monse (Germany) PTS (9-5)
 Lost to Wladimir Klitschko (Ukraine) PTS (1-4)
2000 competed at the Sydney Olympics representing Russia.
 Lost to Audley Harrison (Great Britain) RSC-4

References

External links
 

1973 births
Living people
Super-heavyweight boxers
Boxers at the 1996 Summer Olympics
Boxers at the 2000 Summer Olympics
Olympic boxers of Russia
Olympic bronze medalists for Russia
Olympic medalists in boxing
Russian male boxers
AIBA World Boxing Championships medalists
Medalists at the 1996 Summer Olympics
Competitors at the 1994 Goodwill Games
Sportspeople from Orenburg Oblast